Derrick Raoul Edouard Alfred De Marney (21 September 1906 – 18 February 1978) was an English stage and film actor and producer, of French and Irish ancestry.

Actor
The son of Violet Eileen Concanen and Arthur De Marney, and the grandson of noted Victorian lithographer Alfred Concanen, he appeared on the London stage from 1922 and films from 1928. It was his performance in the lead role of the play Young Mr Disraeli at the Kingsway and Piccadilly theatres that brought him the offer of a long term film contract from Alexander Korda. He is perhaps best remembered for his starring role as Robert Tisdall, falsely accused of murder in Alfred Hitchcock's Young and Innocent (1937). Other early film roles include Benjamin Disraeli, this time in Victoria the Great (1937) and its sequel, Sixty Glorious Years (1938).

After Young and Innocent, he alternated between leading roles and supporting parts in films. He was cast in the title role of Uncle Silas (1947); a character part in which he played a man formerly suspected of murder who plots against his young niece, an heiress played by Jean Simmons. After a couple of more leads in self-produced films, he tended to concentrate on the theatre, only taking small roles in film and television thereafter. His last role was in the horror film The Projected Man (1966).

Although he had a home in Kensington in London, De Marney was taken ill while staying with friends at Farnham in Surrey. He died of bronchopneumonia and asthma at the nearby Frimley Park Hospital on 18 February 1978. He was buried in the family plot at West Norwood Cemetery in South London.

Producer and director
With his brother, the actor Terence De Marney, he formed Concanen Productions and produced a number of wartime documentaries on the Polish Air Force, including The White Eagle and Diary of a Polish Airman (both 1942), as well as Leslie Howard's film The Gentle Sex (1943). He also produced and starred in the thrillers Latin Quarter (1945), She Shall Have Murder (1950), and Meet Mr. Callaghan (1954), a role he had created on stage. He also produced and wrote No Way Back (1949), which starred his brother Terence.

He directed the documentary shorts Malta G.C. and London Scrapbook in 1942.

Partial filmography
As actor, unless otherwise noted.

 Two Little Drummer Boys (1928) - Jack Carsdale
 The Valley of Ghosts (1928) - Arthur Wilmot
 The Forger (1928) - Basil Hale
 Adventurous Youth (1928) - The Englishman
 Stranglehold (1931) - Phillip
 Shadows (1931) - Peter
 Money for Nothing (1932) - Minor Role (uncredited)
 The Laughter of Fools (1933) - Captain Vidal
 Music Hall (1934) - Jim
 The Scarlet Pimpernel (1934) - Member of the League (uncredited)
 Immortal Gentleman (1935) - James Carter / Tybalt
 Windfall (1935) - Tom Spooner
 Once in a New Moon (1935) - Hon. Bryan-Grant
 Things to Come (1936) - Richard Gordon
 Cafe Mascot (1936) - Jerry Wilson
 Land Without Music (1936) - Rudolpho Strozzi
 Conquest of the Air (1936) - Minor Role (uncredited)
 The Pearls of the Crown (1937) - Darnley (uncredited)
 Victoria the Great (1937) - Younger Disraeli
 Young and Innocent (1937) - Robert Tisdall
 Blond Cheat (1938) - Michael Ashburn
 Sixty Glorious Years (1938) - Benjamin Disraeli
 Flying Fifty-Five (1939) - Bill Urquhart
 The Lion Has Wings (1939) - Bill - Navigator
 The Second Mr. Bush (1940) - Tony
 The Spider (1940) - Gilbert Silver
 Three Silent Men (1940) - Captain John Mellish
 Dangerous Moonlight (1941) - Mike Carroll
 The First of the Few (1942) - Squadron Leader Jefferson
 London Scrapbook (1942, director)
 The Gentle Sex (1943, producer)
 Latin Quarter (1945, also producer) - Charles Garrie
 Uncle Silas (1947) - Uncle Silas
 Sleeping Car to Trieste (1948) - George Grant
 No Way Back (1949, producer and screenwriter)
 She Shall Have Murder (1950, also producer) - Dagobert Brown
 Meet Mr. Callaghan (1954, also producer) - Slim Callaghan
 Private's Progress (1956) - Pat
 The March Hare (1956) - Capt. Marlow
 Doomsday at Eleven (1963) - Judge Alderbrook
 The Projected Man (1966) - Latham (final film role)

References

External links

1906 births
1978 deaths
English male film actors
English male stage actors
Male actors from London
Burials at West Norwood Cemetery
20th-century English male actors